Parliamentary elections were held in Kiribati in 2020 to elect members of the House of Assembly. The elections were originally planned on 7 April 2020, with a second round of voting to be held on 15 April 2020. However, in late March the Electoral Commission changed the voting date to 14 April 2020, with a second round on 21 April 2020.

The elections resulted in President Taneti Maamau's pro-China Tobwaan Kiribati Party losing a majority in parliament to parties either supportive of Taiwan or critical of his handling of diplomatic recognition of China.
However, on 22 May, during the first meeting of the new House, the 44 MPs were equally divided on two benches, with 22 supporting the new Boutokaan Kiribati Moa Party and 22 the Tobwaan Kiribati Party.

Electoral system
Of the 45 members of the House of Assembly, 44 were elected in 23 single- and multi-member constituencies (seven with one seat, eleven with two seats and five with three seats) using a modified two-round system. One member was chosen by the Rabi Council of Leaders to represent the Banaban community on Rabi Island in Fiji, while the Speaker is elected after the elections, from outside the House of Assembly, and does not participate in votes.

Voters have as many votes to cast as the number of seats in their constituencies. In the first round a candidate is elected if they receive more than 50% of the ballots cast. Where not all seats are filled, a second round is held with the number of candidates being equal to the number of seats remaining to be filled plus two, with those who received the fewest votes in the first round being eliminated. A tie in the second round results in a third round of voting.

Results

List of elected members

Candidates
The Ministry of Justice communicated the official list of candidates running this general election.

References

Kiribati
Parliamentary election
Kiribati
Elections in Kiribati
Election and referendum articles with incomplete results